Torn Apart is song number 6 on Bastille's VS. (Other People's Heartache, Pt. III) mixtape.

Background 
On 21 October 2014, Bastille announced their third mixtape, VS. (Other People's Heartache, Pt.III), with the release of their song "Torn Apart", featuring the artist GRADES and Lizzo on Zane Lowe's Radio 1 show. VS. (Other People's Heartache, Pt.III) was released on 8 December 2014.

The song was produced by a Londonese producer GRADES. The song was released as a single promoting the VS. mixtape on November 30, 2014.

Video 
The video for "Torn Apart" was uploaded on YouTube on November 21, 2014.

Chart performance

Weekly charts

References

2014 songs
2014 singles
Bastille (band) songs
Virgin Records singles
Songs written by Dan Smith (singer)
Songs written by Grades (producer)